Amolops bellulus (common name: Pianma torrent frog) is a species of frog in the family Ranidae that is endemic to the Gaoligong Mountains. It is only known from the area of its type locality in Nujiang Lisu Autonomous Prefecture in Yunnan, China, but it is expected to occur in the adjacent Myanmarian part of the mountains. Amolops bellulus lives in and near fast-flowing mountain streams. Its status is insufficiently known.

References

bellulus
Amphibians described in 2000
Amphibians of China
Endemic fauna of Yunnan
Taxonomy articles created by Polbot